Swineshead may refer to:

 Richard Swineshead (fl. c. 1340–1354), English mathematician, logician and natural philosopher
 Swineshead, Bedfordshire (historically in Huntingdonshire), a civil parish
 Church of St Nicholas, Swineshead, Bedfordshire
 Swineshead Wood, a Site of Special Scientific Interest near Swineshead, Bedfordshire
 Swineshead, Lincolnshire, a village and civil parish
 Swineshead Abbey, a former religious establishment near Swineshead, Lincolnshire
 Swineshead railway station, serving Swineshead, Lincolnshire

See also